|}

The Paddy's Reward Club Chase is a Grade 1 National Hunt steeplechase in Ireland. It is run at Leopardstown Racecourse in December, over a distance of about 2 miles and 1 furlong (3,420 metres) and during the race there are 11 fences to be jumped. The race was first run in 1998 as a Listed race, before being run as a Grade 1 race from 2007 onwards. The race is sponsored by Paddy Power bookmakers and has had various titles promoting Paddy Power products during its history. The 2019 race was run as the Paddy's Rewards Club "Loyalty's Dead, Live For Rewards" Chase.

Records
Most successful horse (3 wins):
 Big Zeb  – 2008, 2010, 20011

Leading jockey (3 wins):
 Ruby Walsh – Papillon (1998, 2000), Douvan (2016) 
 Barry Geraghty – Moscow Flyer (2002, 2003), Big Zeb (2010) 
 Paul Townend -  Golden Silver (2009), Twinlight (2014), Chacun Pour Soi (2020) 

Leading trainer (5 wins):
 Willie Mullins - Golden Silver (2009), Twinlight (2014), Douvan (2016), Chacun Pour Soi (2020), Blue Lord (2022)

Winners

See also
 Horse racing in Ireland
 List of Irish National Hunt races

References
Racing Post:

National Hunt races in Ireland
National Hunt chases
Leopardstown Racecourse
Recurring sporting events established in 1998
1998 establishments in Ireland